The relationship between Napoleon and the Catholic Church was an important aspect of his rule.

Attack on Pius VI

In 1796, First French Republic troops under the command of Napoleon Bonaparte invaded Italy, defeated the papal troops and occupied Ancona and Loreto.

Pope Pius VI sued for peace, which was granted at Tolentino on 19 February 1797, but on 28 December that year, in a riot papal forces blamed on Italian and French revolutionaries, the popular brigadier-general Mathurin-Léonard Duphot, who had gone to Rome with Joseph Bonaparte as part of the French embassy, was killed and a new pretext was furnished for invasion. General Berthier marched to Rome, entered it unopposed on 10 February 1798 and, proclaiming a Roman Republic, demanded the pope renounce his temporal power.

Upon his refusal he was taken prisoner, and on 20 February he was escorted from the Vatican to Siena, and then to the Certosa near Florence. The French declaration of war against Tuscany led to his removal, escorted by the Spaniard Pedro Gómez Labrador, Marquis of Labrador, by way of Parma, Piacenza, Turin and Grenoble to the citadel of Valence, the chief town of Drôme. He died there six weeks after his arrival, on 29 August 1799, having reigned longer than any pope.

Pius VI's body was embalmed, but was not buried until 30 January 1800 after Napoleon saw political advantage to burying his remains in an effort to bring the Catholic Church back into France.

Napoleon realized the importance of religion as a means to increase obedience and his power and control over the French. It was not until the conclave of cardinals had gathered to elect a new pope that Napoleon decided to bury Pope Pius VI who had died several weeks earlier. He gave him a gaudy ceremony in an effort to gain the attention of the Catholic Church. This eventually led to the Concordat of 1801 negotiated by Ercole Consalvi, the pope's secretary of state, which re-systemised the linkage between the French church and Rome. However, the Concordat also contained the "Organic Articles" which Consalvi had fiercely opposed but which Napoleon had nevertheless instituted.

Peace of Lunéville
The papacy had suffered a major loss of church lands through secularizations in the Holy Roman Empire following the Peace of Lunéville (1801), when a number of German princes were compensated for their losses by the seizure of ecclesiastical property.

Concordat of 1801
The Concordat of 1801 is an agreement between Napoleon Bonaparte and Pope Pius VII that reaffirmed the Roman Catholic Church as the majority church of France and restored some of its civil status.

While the Concordat restored some ties to the papacy, it largely favored the interests of the French state; the balance of church-state relations had tilted firmly in Bonaparte's favour. As a part of the Concordat, he presented another set of laws called the Organic Articles.

Relations with Pius VII
From the beginning of his papacy to the fall of  Napoleon in 1815, Pius VII was completely involved with France. He and Napoleon were continually in conflict, often involving the French military leader's wishes for concessions to his demands.

Imperial coronation

Despite the opposition of most of the Roman Curia, Pius VII traveled to Paris for Napoleon's coronation in 1804. Napoleon placed the crown on his head himself, spurning the pope's intent to do so. The painting by David titled The Coronation of Napoleon depicts the seated pope at the ceremony as Napoleon crowns his wife.

Although the pope and the papacy were promised rich gifts and donations, Pius initially refused most of these offers. Napoleon did give him the Napoleon Tiara, decorated with large emeralds from the looted tiara of Pope Pius VI, but it was deliberately made too small and heavy to be worn and meant as an insult to the pope. Napoleon also commissioned a Portrait of Pope Pius VII by David.

Influence of Cardinal Fesch
Appointed by Napoleon on 4 April 1803 to succeed Cacault on the latter's retirement from the position of French ambassador at Rome, Cardinal Joseph Fesch was assisted by Châteaubriand, but soon sharply differed with him on many questions. Towards the close of 1804, Napoleon entrusted to Fesch the difficult task of securing the presence of Pope Pius VII at the forthcoming coronation of the emperor at Notre Dame in Paris (2 December 1804). The Cardinal's tact in overcoming the reluctance of the pope (only eight months after the execution of the duc d'Enghien) received further recognition. He received the grand cordon of the Légion d'honneur, became grand-almoner of the empire and had a seat in the French senate. He was to receive further honours. In 1806 one of the most influential of the German clerics, Karl von Dalberg, then prince-bishop of Regensburg, chose him to be his coadjutor and designated him as his successor.

Subsequent events damaged his prospects. Over 1806–1807, Napoleon clashed sharply with the Pope on matters both political and religious, as Fesch sought in vain to reconcile them. Napoleon was inexorable in his demands, and Pius VII refused to compromise the discipline and vital interests of the church. The emperor several times rebuked Fesch as weak and ingrateful. It is clear, however, that the Cardinal went as far as possible in counselling the submission of the spiritual to the civil power. For a time he was not on speaking terms with the pope, and Napoleon recalled him from Rome.

Role of the Archbishop of Paris
Napoleon appointed Jean-Baptiste de Belloy bishop to the See of Paris. Notwithstanding his extreme age he governed his new diocese with astonishing vigour and intelligence, reorganized the parishes, provided them with good pastors, and visited his flock in person. He restored the Crown of Thorns (10 August 1806) to its place of honour in the Sainte Chapelle. Napoleon was so well satisfied that he secured for him the cardinal's hat, which Pius VII placed on the prelate's head in Paris on 1 February 1805.

Papal states
Relations between the Church and Napoleon deteriorated. On 3 February 1808 General Miollis occupied Rome with a division. In the next month, the puppet Kingdom of Italy annexed the papal provinces Ancona, Macerata, Fermo, and Urbino, and diplomatic relations were broken off.

On 17 May 1809, Napoleon issued two decrees from the Schönbrunn Palace near Vienna in which he reproached the popes for the ill use they had made of the donation of Charlemagne, his "august predecessor”, and declared those territories which were still under the direct control of the Papal State were to be annexed to the French empire. The territories were to be organized under Miollis with a council extraordinary to administer them. As compensation the Pope would receive a stipend of 2,000,000 francs per annum.<ref>John Holland Rose  The Life of Napoleon I, Including New Materials from the British Official Records. Volume 2  Adamant Media Corporation , . p. 191</ref> On 10 June, Miollis had the Pontifical flag, which still floated over the castle of Saint Angelo, lowered.

Excommunication

When Pius VII subsequently excommunicated Napoleon, one of his most ambitious officers, Lieutenant Radet, saw an opportunity to gain favor by kidnapping the Pope. Although Napoleon had captured Castel Sant'Angelo and pointed cannons at the papal bedroom, he did approve this outrage. Yet Napoleon kept the Pope a prisoner, moving him thoughtout his territories despite his infirmity, though most of his confinement took place at Savona. Napoleon sent several delegations to pressure the Pope to yield power and sign a new concordat with France.

Papal rescue
The Pope remained in confinement for over six years, and did not return to Rome until 24 May 1814, when the 5th Radetzky Hussars of the Allied forces freed him during a pursuit of Napoleonic forces. The Hungarian Hussars escorted the pope back to Rome through the Alps. 

Captain János Nepomuki Horváth gave his own coat to warm the pope, the same officer depicted as the protagonist of Sándor Petőfi's epic "János Vitéz". For his gallantry Horváth received the highest papal decoration, the Supreme Order of Christ. The pope also gave the Hussars a flag, now in the Arsenal in Vienna, reading "Ungariae Patronae Pium comitatis ad Urbem; O felix tanto Roma sub auspicio - Boldog vagy Róma, hogy érzed a Magyarok Nagyasszonyának oltalmát, ki Piust a Városba kísérte" ("You are happy Rome to feel the protection of Our Lady of Hungary, who accompanied Pius to the City").

Congress of Vienna
At the Congress of Vienna (1814–1815) the Papal States were largely restored. The Jesuits were restored. The Pope offered a refuge in his capital to the members of the Bonaparte family. Princess Letitia, the deposed emperor's mother, lived there; likewise did his brothers Lucien and Louis and his uncle, Cardinal Fesch.

Reconciliation with the Church
During Napoleon's exile at Saint Helena, the pope wrote to the British government asking for better treatment of the former emperor, saying: “He can no longer be a danger to anybody. We would not wish him to become a cause for remorse.”''

Napoleon reconciled with the Catholic Church and asked for a chaplain, saying "it would rest my soul to hear Mass". The Pope petitioned the British to allow this, and sent the Abbé Ange Vignali to Saint Helena. On 20 April 1821, Napoleon told General Montholon "I was born in the Catholic religion. I wish to fulfill the duties it imposes, and receive the succour it administers." To Montholon he affirmed his belief in God and read aloud the  Old Testament, the Gospels, and the acts of the Apostles. He died on 5 May 1821, after receiving the sacraments of Confession, Extreme Unction and Viaticum in the presence of Father Vignali.

References

First French Empire
Foreign relations of the Holy See
Napoleon